Preserje (also known as Preserje nad Rihemberkom) is a village in western Slovenia in the Municipality of Nova Gorica. It has a population of 457. It is located in the low hills above the settlement of Branik (formerly known as Rihemberk) in the Vipava Valley.

The local church is dedicated to Saint Catherine and belongs to the Parish of Branik.

References

External links

Preserje on Geopedia

Populated places in the City Municipality of Nova Gorica